Kuprava Parish is an administrative unit of Balvi Municipality in the Latgale region of Latvia.

Towns, villages and settlements of Kuprava Parish

References 

Parishes of Latvia
Balvi Municipality
Latgale